This is a list of Albanian swimmers.

Male swimmers
 Frank Leskaj (born 1971)
 Kreshnik Gjata (born 1983)
 Sidni Hoxha (born 1992)
 Noel Borshi (born 1996)
 Klavio Meça (born 1996)
 Nikol Merizaj (born 1998)

Female swimmers
 Diana Basho (born 2000)
 Rovena Marku (born 1987)
 Nikol Merizaj (born 1998)
 Katie Rock (born 2003)

See also 
 Albanian Swimming Federation

Albanian swimmers
Albania